William Leonard Blankenship (7 March 1928 – 2 December 2017) was an American operatic tenor, music pedagogue at the collegiate level, stage and television actor, and stage director.

Biography
In Europe, Blankenship sang roles at the opera houses in Vienna (Vienna Volksoper & Vienna State Opera), Stuttgart, Hamburg, Braunschweig (1957–60), Bern (1960), Mannheim, Brunswick, Munich (from 1965), Berne, Klagenfurt (1956 European debut), Bregenz (1972 as Phoebus in The Fairy-Queen by Henry Purcell).  In the United States, he sang with the Santa Fe Opera, San Antonio, San Diego (1968), Dallas Opera, and Houston Grand Opera.  He has sung in international festivals in Moscow, Salzburg, Vienna, Munich, and Rio de Janeiro.  He performed concerts with major orchestras on radio and television.

Selected discography 
 Giuseppe Verdi: Otello, re-released by Arthaus Musik (in mono) (2010)
Singers:  Adolf Dallapozza, Willy Ferenz, Margarita Lilova, Leo Heppe, Norman Mittelmann, Walter Kreppel, Wolfgang Windgassen, William Blankenship, Sena Jurinac
Conductor:  Argeo Quadri
Orchestras:  Vienna State Opera Chorus, South German Radio Symphony Orchestra,  Vienna Boys' Choir
 Ernst Krenek, Jonny spielt auf (Jonny Strikes Up)
LP – Amadeo AVRS 5038, Philips SAL 3498 (1965); Amadeo AVRS 13 257
CD (re-release) Vanguard Classics (1994)
 William Blankenship (Max), Evelyn Lear (Anita), Gerd Feldhoff (Jonny), Thomas Stewart (Daniello), Lucia Popp (Yvonne)
Vienna Volksoper Orchestra, Vienna Academy Chamber Choir, Heinrich Hollreiser, conductor
 Othmar Schoeck, Penthesilea BASF Harmonia Mundi 49 22485-6 (1975)
Hana Janku, Barbara Scherler, sopranos; Carl Smith, mezzo-soprano; Raili Kostia, contralto; William Blankenship, tenor; Roland Hermann, Kurt Widmer, baritones; supporting soloists; Choir of North German Radio Hamburg; Kölner Rundfunkchor; Kölner Rundfunk-Sinfonie-Orchester; Zdeněk Mácal, conductor

Education 
After a year at the University of Texas at Austin, Blankenship, in 1947, won a three-year scholarship to study with Mary McCormic at the University of North Texas College of Music, where in 1950 he earned a Bachelor of Music degree.  While an undergraduate at North Texas, he sang major opera roles with the school's Opera Workshop directed by Mary McCormic.  After three years in the Air Force (1950–1953), he attended the Juilliard School (1953–1955), studying voice with Mack Harrell and Povla Frijsh.

In 1954, Blankenship was selected by Mary Garden for the National Arts Foundation's operatic fellowship, which included a $1,200 stipend and promise of engagements in leading opera houses of France and Italy.  Garden, who had auditioned 300 young American singers said that Blankenship was the finest tenor voice she had heard in America.  The fellowship included a tour of study at the Vienna Academy of Music from 1955 to 1956, where he earned an opera diploma.

In 1971, the University of North Texas honored Blankenship as a "Distinguished Graduate."

Family 
William Blankenship, in 1952, married Barbara Estelle Connally (maiden; 1930–1997). They had three children:
 Beverly Elizabeth Blankenship (born 1952), stage and opera director
 Rebecca Blankenship (born 1954), an operatic soprano
 Todd Lawrence Blankenship (born 1955)

William Blankenship died December 2, 2017, in Vienna.  When he died, he had been married to Sawako Yamada, a pianist. Blankenship was cremated at Feuerhalle Simmering and his ashes are buried there.

References

External links

1928 births
2017 deaths
American operatic tenors
University of North Texas College of Music alumni
Juilliard School alumni
People from Gatesville, Texas
Singers from Texas
20th-century American male opera singers
Classical musicians from Texas
Burials at Feuerhalle Simmering